Steamboat Creek is a short tributary of the North Umpqua River in southwestern Oregon in the United States.

The North Umpqua and its tributaries renowned for its prolific runs of summer steelhead, including a high percentage of native fish. Steamboat Creek has been closed to fishing since 1932.

The watershed of the creek was extensively clearcut during the late 1950s and 1960s until forestry practices were changed. The recovery of the river, including the anadromous fish population is closely monitored as a test case for riparian habitat management.

References

External links 
 Status Review for Oregon's Umpqua River Sea-Run Cutthroat Trout

Rivers of Oregon
Rivers of Lane County, Oregon
Rivers of Douglas County, Oregon